Sinningia canastrensis is a tuberous member of the flowering plant family Gesneriaceae. It is found in Brazil.

References

Further reading
SanMartin‐Gajardo, I., and M. Sazima. "Non‐Euglossine Bees also Function as Pollinators of Sinningia Species (Gesneriaceae) in Southeastern Brazil."Plant Biology 6.4 (2004): 506-512.
Camargo, Eduardo, Licléia da Cruz Rodrigues, and Andréa Cardoso Araujo. "Pollination biology and reproduction of Seemannia sylvatica (Kunth) Hanstein (Gesneriaceae) in the Serra da Bodoquena National Park, Mato Grosso do Sul." Biota Neotropica 11.4 (2011): 125–130.

External links

canastrensis
Flora of Brazil